1995 World Masters Athletics Championships is the eleventh in a series of World Masters Athletics Outdoor Championships (called World Veterans Championships, World Veterans Athletic Championships, or World Veterans Games at the time) that took place in Buffalo, New York, United States from 13 to 23 July 1995.

The main venue was University at Buffalo Stadium,

which had been built 2 years prior to host the 1993 World University Games.

Supplemental venues included Walter Kunz Stadium, also located on the campus of University at Buffalo.

American masters athlete Ruth Anderson (65), who had participated in all eleven Championships in this series,

carried a friendship torch into the stadium to light an Olympic-style flame during opening ceremonies on Friday, 14 July.

This edition of masters athletics Championships had a minimum age limit of 35 years for women and 40 years for men.

The governing body of this series is World Association of Veteran Athletes (WAVA). WAVA was formed during meeting at the inaugural edition of this series at Toronto in 1975, then officially founded during the second edition in 1977, then renamed as World Masters Athletics (WMA) at the Brisbane Championships in 2001.

This Championships was organized by WAVA in coordination with a Local Organising Committee (LOC) of Vito J. Borrello, Neal Fatin, Robert Greene.

In addition to a full range of track and field events,

non-stadia events included 10K Cross Country, 10K Race Walk (women), 20K Race Walk (men), and Marathon. This may be the hottest Championships in the series so far, with temperatures around 104 °F.

Due to a shortage of ambulances and dangers from heat exhaustion, some Cross Country races were postponed.

Due to an accidental detour, the W55 Cross Country was run short of the 10K distance.

Results
Past Championships results are archived at WMA.

Additional archives are available from Museum of Masters Track & Field

as a searchable pdf

and in pdf newsletters from National Masters News.

Several masters world records were set at this Championships. World records for 1985 are from the list of World Records in the Museum of Masters Track & Field searchable pdf unless otherwise noted. Top 3 medal winners are listed only for selected age groups.

Women

Men

M40

M45

M50

M55

M60

M65

M70

M75

M80

M85

M90

References

World Masters Athletics Championships
World Masters Athletics Championships
International track and field competitions hosted by the United States
1995
Masters athletics (track and field) records